Diverse Recourse is a 2007 release from Underground hip hop producer Joe Beats.  It is considered a sequel to 2002's Reverse Discourse.

Track listing

2007 albums
Joe Beats albums